The 2005 Iranian Super Cup was the first Iranian Super Cup, held on 28 August 2005  between the 2004–05 Iran Pro League champions Foolad and the 2004–05 Hazfi Cup winners Saba.

Match

References

Iranian Super Cup 
2005